Alexandra Stadium is a multi-use stadium in Alexandra, Johannesburg, Gauteng, South Africa. It is primarily used for football matches and is the home venue of Alexandra United in the SAFA Second Division.

Sports venues in Johannesburg
Soccer venues in South Africa